"Chapter Eight: Know Your Truth" is the eighth episode and season finale of the first season of the American dark comedy crime television series Barry. The episode was written by series creators Alec Berg and Bill Hader, and directed by Berg. It was first broadcast on HBO in the United States on May 13, 2018.

The series follows Barry Berkman, a hitman from Cleveland who travels to Los Angeles to kill someone but finds himself joining an acting class taught by Gene Cousineau, where he meets aspiring actress Sally Reed and begins to question his path in life as he deals with his criminal associates such as Monroe Fuches and NoHo Hank. In the episode, Barry wants to leave his criminal life behind but has to interfere when Fuches' life is in danger, while the police is closing in on him.

According to Nielsen Media Research, the episode was seen by an estimated 0.548 million household viewers and gained a 0.2 ratings share among adults aged 18–49. The episode received critical acclaim, with critics praising the writing, directing, performances, character development, suspense and ending. However, some critics questioned if the decision to continue the series would be effective.

Plot
Barry (Bill Hader) visits Fuches (Stephen Root) at his hotel room, who is delighted to see him alive. However, Barry punches Fuches and then takes part of his money, telling him he is done with his criminal life and leaves.

Angry, Fuches decides to go to Pazar (Glenn Fleshler), informing him of Barry's survival and offering a partnership to kill him. However, Pazar is aware of Barry's acting class and refuses to cooperate with him. He has his henchmen tie Fuches to a chair in the garage, and brings Vacha's twin, Ruslan (Mark Ivanir), to torture Fuches, after which he will kill Fuches while he goes to kill Barry. Scared for Barry's safety, Hank (Anthony Carrigan) calls Barry to tell him about Pazar's incoming attack, telling him to leave town. Meanwhile, Moss (Paula Newsome) and her colleagues find Barry's copy of Gene's (Henry Winkler) book at Taylor's apartment, eventually getting enough evidence to get a warrant for Pazar.

Pazar is angry to see that Ruslan wasted time building a pillory and decides to kill Fuches himself. Before he can do so, Barry kills Pazar and his men through a window and then leaves with Fuches. He takes him to the airport and, despite Fuches asking him not to do it, Barry gives him all the money and tells him to leave the city, as he is done with his criminal life. Meanwhile, Hank and the remaining henchmen discover Pazar's corpse just as the authorities are arriving. They decide to flee with the Bolivians, with Sifuentes (Michael Irby) accepting them. At an LAPD conference, the police blame the attack on Taylor and Ryan Madison, thinking both planned to send the Chechens and the Bolivians to war with each other, closing the case and staining Ryan's image. 

Barry visits Sally (Sarah Goldberg) at a bar, telling her he plans to quit the class, but she convinces him to stay and to act alongside her in an adaptation of The Front Page. A few weeks later, Barry and Sally are now in a relationship and are staying with Gene and Moss at Gene's lake house. Moss notes that Barry is now using the "Barry Block" stage name for his performances. During dinner, Gene recalls the time Barry approached at his car and gave a "monologue" about killing people, which arouses Moss' suspicions, worrying Barry. 

That night, Moss sneaks out and uses her laptop to find Barry's Facebook profile, finding him connected to Chris Lucado and, in turn, Chris' connection to Taylor. Remembering the silhouetted man from the lipstick camera, Moss concludes that Barry is the hitman. Barry approaches her, explaining he is not proud of his actions and he tried to leave it behind, deeming himself "a good person" and saying they are both equal. Moss rebuffs the claim and forces him to start walking toward the house, while Barry tells her not to pursue anything further. Moss ignores this, prompting Barry to approach a tree that holds a silencer, and shots are fired. The next morning, Barry returns to his room with a sleeping Sally. He once again tells himself that his criminal life is over "starting now".

Production

Development
In February 2018, the episode's title was revealed as "Chapter Eight: Know Your Truth" and it was announced that series creators Alec Berg and Bill Hader had written the episode while Berg had directed it. This was Berg's third writing credit, Hader's third writing credit, and Berg's second directing credit.

Writing
The time jump at the second half of the episode was done in an attempt to trick the viewers into thinking it was another fantasy of Barry, a recurring gag throughout the season. The original ending included a different version. In the original version, Barry bought a house at a midpoint of the series, and Moss would discover crucial evidence when she visited his bathroom. The writers scrapped the plan as Hader deemed it "too pat". Alec Berg then suggested setting the final moments at Gene's lake house. 

Regarding Barry's decision to kill Moss, Berg said "At the beginning of the season, he's not fulfilled and he's leading a life of quiet desperation, but he's also not exposing himself to the emotional ramifications of anything he's done, and that has its advantages. So trying to run to the light the way he is, it exposes him to have to emotionally dissect everything that he's done in his life. And it makes his life a hell of a lot harder, not easier." The writers also worked on ways to avoid killing Goran Pazar, but Hader said "every way we looked at it, and we did for days, it just all came back to Barry cannot move on if Goran is alive."

Reception

Viewers
The episode was watched by 0.548 million viewers, earning a 0.2 in the 18-49 rating demographics on the Nielson ratings scale. This means that 0.2 percent of all households with televisions watched the episode. This was a 14% decrease from the previous episode, which was watched by 0.636 million viewers with a 0.2 in the 18-49 demographics.

Critical reviews
"Chapter Eight: Know Your Truth" received critical acclaim. Vikram Murthi of The A.V. Club gave the episode an "A-" and wrote, "The hitman path will only bring further pain and acting seemingly requires him to rely on that pain. It's a no-win situation for ol' Barry, a man who just wants to escape but is ill-equipped to do so. But then, about halfway through 'Chapter Eight', something improbable happens. The world conspires to give Barry the fresh start he so desires. A series of betrayals and misunderstandings provide him an out that he never saw coming. In the world of Barry, this counts as something close to a miracle." 

Alan Sepinwall of Uproxx wrote, "this season kept surprising me in so many ways, and particularly in how the writing and Hader's performance didn't flinch from the tragedy Barry brings into the world. So I will hope they have a specific — and hopefully short-term — plan for where the story goes next, and will look forward to seeing what that is next year." In a simplistic take, Emily VanDerWerff of Vox wrote, "I almost wish the last moments of 'Know Your Truth' were the last moments of the show, period. We know Barry well enough now to be aware of how blinded he is from who he is, how little he actually knows his truth. 'Starting now—' is a promise he'll never keep to himself. Do we really need to see that unfold, season after season? Or can we just know that failure is inevitable?" 

Nick Harley of Den of Geek gave the episode a perfect 5 star rating out of 5 and wrote, "With such a quiet, powerful ending, 'Chapter Eight: Know Your Truth' had me lingering in my seat long after the credits rolled completely stunned by the excellence of Barrys first season. Deeply human, funny, and surprising, Barry is more ambitious and surehanded than any comedy in the last ten years, barring only The Good Place and Bojack Horseman." Charles Bramesco of Vulture gave the episode a perfect 5 star rating out of 5 and wrote, "Barry isn't the story of a criminal struggling to join the light side, or even the story of a fundamentally all right yet passive guy learning to assert himself. It's the story of a lonesome man building a richer existence by filling his life with connections and passions and desires. It's the story of a withdrawn cipher growing into an actor by the basest dictionary definition: one who does."

Emily Yahr of The Washington Post wrote, "Terrific Barry shows how HBO's best dramas are often found in its comedies." Miles Surrey of The Ringer wrote, "The season finale of Barry pushes its hitman-turned-actor protagonist into a corner, and shines a light on the performative nature of being human."

References

External links
 "Chapter Eight: Know Your Truth" at HBO
 

Barry (TV series) episodes
2018 American television episodes
Television episodes written by Bill Hader